The Garcia River is a river on the northern coast of California, in southern Mendocino County. The Garcia River empties into the Pacific Ocean just north of Point Arena. This place is called P'da Hau in the Native California Indians' language who reside on the outlet of the coast.  

It is named for the settler Rafael Garcia who was granted ownership of the land in 1844.

The river provides recreation, agricultural and industrial water supply for the community of Point Arena, California, and wildlife habitat including cold freshwater habitat for fish migration and spawning.  Excessive erosion caused by logging, grazing and gravel mining is the most serious issue facing the Garcia River. Logging in the area began in the 19th century, but the most damage occurred in the decades after World War II. During this time, modern machinery was available, increasing production, but environmental regulations and industry good practices had not yet been developed. The river and its tributaries were often clogged with logging slash. In addition, skidding the logs over streams destroyed their protective vegetation. The streams were eventually cleared of this debris, naturally and through human efforts. Unfortunately, there is now a lack of large woody debris in the streams because of the extensive logging. This debris is needed for salmonid reproduction, to help prevent erosion and to create pool habitat for aquatic organisms.

About 80 percent of the land in the watershed is privately owned. Coast Forestlands is the largest landowner in the area, followed by Louisiana Pacific and Mailliard Ranch. There are several more large landowners that own the bulk of the rest. However, some land of the land consists of private residences and small ranches and farms. Public access to the river and the rest of the watershed is limited due to this private ownership.

Course

After receiving water from Inman Creek, it turns northwestward along the San Andreas Fault rift zone. Then the North Fork Garcia River enters from the right. Just south of Mountain View Road, it turns westward again, flowing under State Route 1 at milepost 18.5. It discharges into the Pacific Ocean between Point Arena and Manchester State Beach.

See also
Buckridge Ranch House, overlooks the river
List of rivers in California
Manchester Band of Pomo Indians of the Manchester Rancheria
Point Arena Hot Springs

References

External links
State Water Resources Control Board
Klamath Resource Information System

Rivers of Mendocino County, California
Rivers of Northern California